South Park is a  neighborhood within the South Los Angeles region of Los Angeles, California.

Geography
According to the Mapping L.A. project of the Los Angeles Times, South Park is bordered by Historic South Central on the north, Central-Alameda on the east, Florence on the south and Vermont-Slauson and Vermont Square on the west.

Demographics

According to Mapping L.A., a total of 30,496 people lived in South Park's 1.41 square miles, as measured by the 2000 U.S. census—averaging 21,638 people per square mile. Population was estimated at 32,851 in 2008. The median age was 23. The percentages of residents aged birth to 34 were among the county's highest.

Latinos made up 78.6% of the population, with African Americans at 19.2%, white 1%, Asian 0.1%, and other 1%.  Mexico and El Salvador were the most common places of birth for the 49.4% of the residents who were born abroad.

The $29,518 median household income in 2008 dollars was considered low for the city and county. The percentage of households earning $20,000 or less was high, compared to the county at large. The average household size of 3.9 people was high for the city. Renters occupied 72.3% of the housing units, and homeowners occupied the rest.

In 2000 there were 1,607 families headed by single parents, or 27.9%. The percentages of never-married women (39.1) and never-married men (45.5).

In 2000 there were 569 military veterans, or 3% of the population.

Recreation and parks

The neighborhood's only recreation facility, South Park, at 345 East 51st Street, was established on a 20-acre plot purchased from "the Boetcher estate" in 1900, and after its planting with orange, oak and walnut trees, it was said to "compare favorably with any of the city's older beauty spots." It fronted on South Park Avenue, now Avalon Boulevard. The water well and pump house developed at that time are still in existence.

The park features a baseball diamond (lighted), basketball courts (lighted/outdoor), children's play area, picnic tables, seasonal pool (outdoor/unheated) and tennis courts (lighted).

Education
The schools within South Park's boundaries are:
 George Washington Carver Middle School, LAUSD, 4410 McKinley Avenue
 Dr. Maya Angelou Community High School, LAUSD,  300 E 53rd St 
 Synergy Kinetic Academy, LAUSD charter middle school, 1420 East Adams Boulevard
 Los Angeles Academy Middle School, LAUSD, 644 East 56th Street
 Celerity Dyad Charter School, LAUSD elementary, 4501 South Wadsworth Avenue
 Forty-Ninth Street Elementary School, LAUSD, 750 East 49th Street
 Aurora Elementary School, LAUSD, 1050 East 52nd Place
 Main Street Elementary School, LAUSD, 129 East 53rd Street
 Alliance College Ready Middle Academy #12
 Alliance Patti & Peter Neuwirth Leadership Academy
 Synergy Quantum Academy High School

References

External links
  Comments about living in South Park
  South Park crime map and statistics

Neighborhoods in Los Angeles
South Los Angeles